The Bornay Mosque (Cyrillic: Bornay məçete, Борнай мәчете; former The Third Cathedral Mosque), also spelled Burnayevskaya Mosque is a mosque in Kazan, Tatarstan, Russia.

History
Its constructing was donated by Möxämmätsadíq Bornayıv and realized by project of Pyotr Ivanovich Romanov in 1872. The architectural style is national romance eclecticism. The minaret was built in 1895. Believed, that the project of the minaret was elaborated by Fyodor Nikolayevich Malinovsky. The mosque has a minaret over the door, one hall, it is one-storied and is made of red bricks. The interior is designed in the medieval Tatar and Russian traditions. In 1930-1994 Bornay Mosque was out of service due to the Soviet authorities and in 1994 it was returned to the believers.

See also
Islam in Tatarstan
Islam in Russia
List of mosques in Russia
List of mosques in Europe

References
 
 Russian mosques

Mosques in Kazan
Mosques completed in 1872
Closed mosques in the Soviet Union
Mosques in Russia
Mosques in Europe
Cultural heritage monuments of federal significance in Tatarstan